Shree Ganesh Secondary School is a  government school situated in Bhimkhori-8, Shikharpur, Kavre. It was founded in 1963 A.D.
This school has been running from class 1 to class 10.
This school has been providing education to more than 400 students of Kavrepalanchowk district.

Magazine published by Shree Ganesh Secondary School
 Ganesh Jyoti - 2013, Shree Ganesh School, Kavre

Bibliography
 Ganesh Jyoti - 2013, Shree Ganesh School, Kavre

References

See also
 List of schools in Nepal
 School Leaving Certificate (Nepal)

Schools in Nepal
Education in Kavrepalanchok District
1963 establishments in Nepal